Arthrostylidium simpliciusculum is a species of Arthrostylidium bamboo in the grass family.

Distribution 
The species is native to Brazil, Colombia, Ecuador, and Peru.

Description 
Arthrostylidium simpliciusculum is a tufted perennial with short rhizomes. It grows to between 1 m and 1.2 m in height.

References

External links 
 Specimens in United States National Herbarium

simpliciusculum